Jean-Baptiste de Durfort (28 January 1684 - Paris, 8 July 1770) was 3rd Duke of de Duras, Marshal of France and Pair de France.

Biography
Jean-Baptiste de Durfort is the second son of Jacques Henri de Durfort de Duras, duc de Duras, Marshal of France, and Marguerite-Felice de Levis-Ventadour. 
With the death of his older brother Jacques-Henri II in September 1697, he became 3rd Duke of Duras, Marquis de Blanquefort, Comte de Rauzan, Baron de Pujols, de Landrouet et, de Cypressac, Seigneur de Chitain, d'Urbize, de Cambert etc. . His father resigned in 1689 and died in 1704.

On 10 June 1702, he took part in the unsuccessful surprise attack on Nijmegen as part of the War of the Spanish Succession. On 30 March 1710, he was made Maréchal de camp and on 31 March, he was appointed Lieutenant-général des Armées du Roi. On 13 May 1731 he was accepted into the Order of the Holy Spirit. In 1733 he passed his titles on to his son Emmanuel-Félicité de Durfort. 

During the War of the Polish Succession, he took part in the Siege of Kehl (1733) and the Siege of Philippsburg (1734). In 1741 he was appointed Marshal of France. In 1755 he became Governor of Franche-Comté. In December 1755, the Duchy of Duras was raised to a peerage.

Marriage and Children 
He married on 6 January 1706 Marie Angélique Victoire de Bournonville (1686-1764), daughter of Alexandre-Albert-François-Barthelemy, Duke and Prince de Bournonville (1662-1705). They had : 

 Victoire Félicité de Durfort (1706-1753), married 
in 1720, Henry James Fitzjames, son of James FitzJames, 1st Duke of Berwick (died 1721)
in 1727, Louis-Marie-Augustin d'Aumont (1709–1782), 5th  Duke of Aumont.
 Emmanuel-Félicité de Durfort (1715-1789), 4th Duke of Duras.

Sources 
Père Anselme. Histoire généalogique et chronologique de la maison royale de France. T. V. — P., 1730., p. 739
Père Anselme, Potier de Courcy, P. Histoire généalogique et chronologique de la maison royale de France. T. IX, partie 2. — P.: Firmin Didot Frères, 1879., p. 603
Pinard F.-J.-G. Chronologie historique-militaire. T. III. — P.: Claud Herissant, 1761., pp. 316—320
La Roque L. de, Catalogue historique des généraux français. — P.: 1902, pp. 27—29
Bouillet-Chassang
geneanet

1684 births
1770 deaths
 3
Marshals of France
Peers created by Louis XV
18th-century French military personnel